The Webber House at 1011 Heights Blvd. in Houston, Texas was built in 1907-1908 by brickmason Samuel H. Webber.  It was listed on the National Register of Historic Places in 1984.

Queen Anne-style houses are not often constructed of brick, but this one is, with brick laid in common bond.  The house also shows Colonial Revival influences.

Gallery

See also
Samuel H. Webber House, also NRHP-listed, located at 407 Heights Blvd. in Houston, also built by Webber

References

Houses on the National Register of Historic Places in Texas
Queen Anne architecture in Texas
Colonial Revival architecture in Texas
Houses completed in 1908
Houses in Houston
1908 establishments in Texas
National Register of Historic Places in Houston